Ageliferin is a chemical compound produced by some sponges. It was first isolated from Caribbean  and then Okinawan marine sponges in the genus Agelas. It often co-exists with the related compound sceptrin and other similar compounds. It has antibacterial properties and can cause biofilms to dissolve.

See also
 Agelas clathrodes
 Agelas conifera

References 

Halogen-containing alkaloids
Organobromides
Pyrroles
Benzimidazoles
Carboxamides